Football Club Deccan is a professional association football club based out of Bangalore, India. The team participates in Bangalore Super Division, the fourth tier of the Indian football system and first division league in the football system in the State of Karnataka.

History 
FC Deccan was founded on 30 September 2017 in Bangalore with a vision of promoting professional football among youngsters, not only in Bangalore but the entire Deccan Plateau region. Hundreds of talented footballers in the city aspiring to play in the top tier of the Bangalore District Football Association (BDFA) have got another avenue with the unveiling of new city-based club FC Deccan. FC Deccan has overseas partners in Germany who are bringing in technical expertise and European style of football to India. The club made headlines on 10 Nov 2017 when it was announced that the side had completed the signings of former I-League midfielder Raju D. of Churchill Brothers and former Premier Futsal player Jonathan Piers of Bangalore franchise Bengaluru Royals.

FC Deccan played their first season in 2017–18 Bangalore Super Division. They ended the season at the bottom of the table and were relegated to 'A' division.

In July 2018, FC Deccan started its "Academy" and "Soccer School" in Bangalore supported by Faimo Sports GmbH, Germany which is headed by Martin Monnerjahn. The program aims to built local talent from U-6 to U-18 who aspire to become professional players.

FC Deccan finished in third position in 'A' Division with 17 points (5W-2D-2L)for the season 2018–19.

FC Deccan finished first and won the championship of 'A' Division with 22 points (7W-1D-1L) for the season 2019–20, along with Young Challengers FC who finished in second place with 22 points but former had better goal difference. Both teams are promoted to Super Division for the season 2020–21.

Colours and Crest 
From the very moment FC Deccan was founded, the club defines its own emblem that the players proudly wore on their shirts. The "Bull" or "Nandi" in local language – on the crest defines strength and courage, the colours yellow signifies radiant nature of the club with colour grey signifying maturity and responsibility. We are the Greyellows.

Players

Current technical staff

References

External links 
 

2017 establishments in Karnataka
Association football clubs established in 2017
Bangalore Super Division
Football clubs in Bangalore